Chase is a town in Oconto County, Wisconsin The population was 2,082 at the time of the 2000 census. The unincorporated communities of Chase and South Chase are located in the town. The unincorporated community of Krakow is also located partially in the town.

Geography
According to the United States Census Bureau, the town has a total area of 35.2 square miles (91.1 km2), of which, 35.1 square miles (91.0 km2) of it is land and 0.04 square miles (0.1 km2) of it (0.09%) is water.

Demographics

As of the census of 2000, there were 2,082 people, 683 households, and 570 families residing in the town. The population density was 59.3 people per square mile (22.9/km2). There were 696 housing units at an average density of 19.8 per square mile (7.6/km2). The racial makeup of the town was 98.37% White, 1.01% Native American, 0.19% Asian, 0.05% from other races, and 0.38% from two or more races. Hispanic or Latino of any race were 0.53% of the population.

There were 683 households, out of which 48.6% had children under the age of 18 living with them, 74.5% were married couples living together, 4.7% had a female householder with no husband present, and 16.5% were non-families. 11.7% of all households were made up of individuals, and 5.0% had someone living alone who was 65 years of age or older. The average household size was 3.05 and the average family size was 3.34.

In the town, the population was spread out, with 33.4% under the age of 18, 5.5% from 18 to 24, 35.1% from 25 to 44, 18.9% from 45 to 64, and 7.1% who were 65 years of age or older. The median age was 33 years. For every 100 females, there were 107.0 males. For every 100 females age 18 and over, there were 107.5 males.

The median income for a household in the town was $55,385, and the median income for a family was $58,804. Males had a median income of $39,243 versus $24,667 for females. The per capita income for the town was $18,219. About 3.6% of families and 4.9% of the population were below the poverty line, including 5.8% of those under age 18 and 5.2% of those age 65 or over.

Notable places

Chase Stone Barn

The Daniel E. Krause Stone Barn, also known as the Chase Stone Barn, is listed on the National Register of Historic Places. It was designed by farmer Daniel E. Krause and built by stonemason William Mensenkamp, and is renowned for its historical significance.

References

External links

 

Towns in Oconto County, Wisconsin
Green Bay metropolitan area
Towns in Wisconsin